The 18th South American Junior Championships in Athletics were held in Quito, Ecuador, at the Estadio Los Chasquis between September 13–16, 1986.

Participation (unofficial)
Detailed result lists can be found on the "World Junior Athletics History" website.  An unofficial count yields the number of about 201 athletes from about 9 countries:  Argentina (31), Brazil (48), Chile (11), Colombia (9), Ecuador (45), Panama (6), Paraguay (2), Peru (36), Venezuela (13).

Medal summary
Medal winners are published for men and women
Complete results can be found on the "World Junior Athletics History" website.

Men

Women

Medal table (unofficial)

References

External links
World Junior Athletics History

South American U20 Championships in Athletics
1986 in Ecuadorian sport
South American U20 Championships
International athletics competitions hosted by Ecuador
1986 in youth sport